David Dvorkin (born October 8, 1943) is an American writer of speculative fiction, born in the UK.

Dvorkin earned a Bachelor of Arts in mathematics and physics from Indiana University as well as an MS in mathematics from the University of Houston. He worked at NASA (1967-1971) as an aerospace engineer on Apollo 8 through Apollo 15, and at Martin Marietta (1971-1974) on the Viking Mars program. Subsequently, he worked as a software developer and technical writer before retiring from full-time work in 2009.

Select Bibliography

Prisoner of the Blood
 Insatiable (1993) 
 Unquenchable (1995)

Star Trek Universe
 The Trellisane Confrontation (1984) 
 Timetrap (1988)
 The Captains' Honor (1989) with Daniel Dvorkin

Standalone novels

Nonfiction
 At Home with Solar Energy (1979)
 The Dead Hand of Mrs. Stifle (2011)
 The Surprising Benefits of Being Unemployed (2012)
 Dust Net (2013)
 Once a Jew, Always a Jew? (2015)
 Self-Publishing Tools, Tips, and Techniques (2018)
 When We Landed on the Moon: A Memoir (2019)

References

External links
Official website

Living people
1943 births
People from Reading, Berkshire
British writers
Indiana University alumni
University of Houston alumni
Martin Marietta people